Emilio Aguinaldo College (EAC) is a private, non-sectarian institute of education located in Manila, Philippines. It runs under the management of the Yaman Lahi Foundation Inc.

History
Emilio Aguinaldo College began with a man who envisioned the Filipino youth to be totally educated and trained through arts, sciences, and technology.
 

That man, Dr. Paulo C. Campos, one of the few Filipino National Scientists noted for his work on nuclear medicine, has been recognized and awarded for his numerous researches and publications. He is also credited for establishing the first and best known Radioisotope Laboratory in the Philippines, the first Research Laboratory in the Department of Medicine, University of the Philippines, and the Thyroid Clinic of the UP-PGH Medical Center.

It was in 1957 when the Marian School of Midwifery, the forerunner of Emilio Aguinaldo College, was established under the management of Marian Clinics, Inc.

Two years after Dr. Crisanto S. Vito Cruz and Gregorio T. Delgado together with Mrs. Lolita R. Vito Cruz established the first Medical Secretarial School in the Philippines, the founding of the Marian School of Nursing and Midwifery immediately followed.

In 1973, the University Physicians’ Services Incorporated (UPSI) took over the school management. From Marian School of Nursing and Midwifery, its name was changed to Marian Junior College. Its level was elevated to full-fledged College with new courses being offered such as Food Service and Technology and the Dietetic Internship Program.

After a year, medical arts and photography (innovative academic program) and the four-year Bachelor of Science in Secretarial Administration earned government recognition.

College of Arts and Sciences was added to the list of colleges in 1976, offering Bachelor of Arts and Bachelor of Science programs. Both Bachelor of Science in nursing and BSN supplemental course were also given government recognition, thus, establishing the College of Nursing.

Marian College began building the first school units at Dasmariñas, Cavite in 1977 to support the government's policy on dispersal and decongestion of student population in Metro Manila particularly in institutions of higher learning. The policy also aimed to introduce regional development and the democratization of opportunities in rural areas.

In September 1977, the name Marian College was changed to General Emilio Aguinaldo College, to apply to both Manila and Cavite campuses. This was in consonance with the new direction of the government in recognizing and honoring national heroes. Eventually, the title “General” was dropped.

All courses offered in Manila were given permit to be offered in Cavite, with the addition of BS Criminology, Master of Arts in teaching, Master of Arts in education, and Master of Science in nursing.

EAC Manila offered BSN supplemental for graduates in nursing (GN), who wanted to pursue Bachelor of Science in nursing, and BS foods and nutrition and industrial cafeteria management.

On the other hand, Cavite campus offered technical courses in agricultural technology, electrical and electronics technology and refrigeration, and air conditioning technology.

On October 21, 1979, EAC Foundation Inc. was established at Dasmariñas, Cavite, thus giving birth to the Emilio Aguinaldo College of Medicine with Dr. Lourdes E. Campos as Dean. In Manila, the College of Business Administration was given permit to operate.

In 1980, UPSI formed the Yaman Lahi Foundation, Inc. to manage and operate Manila and Cavite campuses.

Within the next five years, the focus was on curricular program development, which paved the way to more courses being given government recognition.

The College of Medicine and the University Medical Center of EAC Cavite was sold to De La Salle University, now known as De La Salle University Medical Center (DLSUMC) under the division of De La Salle Medical and Health Sciences Institute (DLSMHSI). After that, the EAC administration focused on the development of EAC-Manila.

Campuses
 
Emilio Aguinaldo College has two campuses. The main Campus is in Ermita, Manila and the other is in Dasmariñas, Cavite. A teaching hospital was established in both campuses. The main campus' teaching hospital is known as Medical Center, Manila. It is one of the best hospitals within reach of people of all economic status. The sports facilities of this college consist of a Basketball Court, Gymnastics area, Running Track, Swimming Pool, Tennis Court, etc. An in-campus student dormitory is available for foreign students.

External links 
  Emilio Aguinaldo College

References

Educational institutions established in 1957
Universities and colleges in Manila
Universities and colleges in Cavite
Education in Ermita
Education in Dasmariñas
1957 establishments in the Philippines
 
National Collegiate Athletic Association (Philippines) colleges